The men's large hill individual ski jumping competition for the 1984 Winter Olympics was held in Igman Olympic Jumps. It occurred on 18 February.

Results

References

Ski jumping at the 1984 Winter Olympics